Peter Raymond Dunbar (born 18 September 1984) is an English former first-class cricketer. 

Dunbar was born at Harrow in September 1984. He was educated at Harrow School, before going up to Balliol College, Oxford. While studying at Oxford, he played first-class cricket for Oxford University, making two appearances against Cambridge University in The University Matches of 2006 and 2007. He scored 52 runs in his two matches, with a high score of 46.

References

External links

1984 births
Living people
People from Harrow, London
People educated at Harrow School
Alumni of Balliol College, Oxford
English cricketers
Oxford University cricketers